Who Saw Him Die? is a 1968 black-and-white Swedish film about a liberal teacher struggling with the demands of teaching a classroom of unruly children. The screenplay is by Clas Engström, based on his own novel. The film won the Golden Bear at the 18th Berlin International Film Festival in 1968.

Cast
 Per Oscarsson - Sören Mårtensson
 Ann-Marie Gyllenspetz - Anne-Marie
 Kerstin Tidelius - Gunvor Mårtensson
 Bengt Ekerot - Eriksson
 Harriet Forssell - Mrs. Berg
 Per Sjöstrand - Headmaster
 Georg Oddner - Georg
 Catti Edfeldt - Jane
 Bo Malmqvist - Bengt

References

External links
 
 
 

1960s Swedish-language films
1968 films
Films based on Swedish novels
Swedish black-and-white films
Films directed by Jan Troell
Golden Bear winners
1968 drama films
1960s Swedish films